Belgium was represented by Louis Neefs, with the song "Jennifer Jennings", at the 1969 Eurovision Song Contest, which took place on 29 March in Madrid. Neefs was chosen internally to be the Belgian representative, and the song was chosen in the national final on 22 February. Neefs had previously represented Belgium in the 1967 contest in Vienna.

Before Eurovision

Artist selection
In December 1968, BRT announced that they had internally selected Louis Neefs to represent Belgium in the Eurovision Song Contest 1969.

Nationale finale van het Songfestival
Nationale finale van het Songfestival was the national final format developed by BRT in order to select Belgium's entry for the Eurovision Song Contest 1969.

Competing entries
Following the announcement of Neefs as Belgian representative, a song submission period was opened where composers were able to submit their songs until 24 January 1969. 127 songs were received by the broadcaster at the end of the deadline, of which six were selected for the national final.

Final
The final was held on 22 February 1969 from 9:05 to 10:00 CET at the Amerikaans Theater in Brussels and was hosted by Nand Baert. Six songs competed in the contest, with the winner being decided upon by a jury panel. In addition to the performances of the competing entries, guest performers included Barry Ryan.

At Eurovision 
On the night of the final Neefs performed 10th in the running order, following Sweden and preceding Switzerland. Neefs is remembered for his quirky performance, which involved throwing his arms in the air in an apparently random manner. At the close of the voting "Jennifer Jennings" had received 10 points (3 from the United Kingdom, 2 from Norway, Spain and Switzerland and 1 from the Netherlands), placing Belgium joint 7th (with Ireland) of the 16 competing entries. The result matched Neefs' 7th place in 1967. The Belgian jury awarded its highest mark (3) to joint contest winners Spain.

Voting

References 

1969
Countries in the Eurovision Song Contest 1969
Eurovision